McMeans is a surname. Notable people with the surname include: 

 Lendrum McMeans (1859–1941), Canadian politician in Manitoba
 Selden A. McMeans (1806–1876), American physician and politician
 Willie McMeans, American baseball player